Forest Hill is a suburb of Johannesburg, South Africa. It is located in Region F of the City of Johannesburg Metropolitan Municipality.

History
It was surveyed in 1897 and the suburb was proclaimed in 1903 developed by Leslie John Elderkin and the suburb name originates after the red gum trees in the area.

References

Johannesburg Region F